Aggar Tum Na Hote is an Indian television drama series that premiered from 9 November 2021 on Zee TV. Produced by Mahesh Pandey under Mahesh Pandey Productions, it stars Simaran Kaur and Himanshu Soni. It went off air on 29 April 2022 and digitally available on ZEE5.

Plot

Cast  
 Simaran Kaur as Niyati Abhimanyu Pandey
 Himanshu Soni	as Abhimanyu Pandey
 Amreen Malhotra as Nitya Mishra
 Riya Soni as Shagun 
 Avinash Wadhawan as Gajendra Pandey
 Anita Kulkarni as Manorama Gajendra Pandey
 Sangeeta Adhikary	as Devi Mami
 Reyaansh Vir Chadha as Angad Tiwari
 Harsh Vashisht as Bhagwati Tiwari
 Krishna Kant Singh Bundela as Pandit ji

Production 
The series was announced in 2021 by Zee TV. The teaser of the series was released on 16 October  2021. Simaran Kaur was cast in the titular role, and was joined by Himanshu Soni as leads. The series marks comeback for Avinash Wadhawan into fiction after three years. On 29 March 2022, the show has completed 100 episodes. In March 2022, Amreen Malhotra was cast to portray Nitya Mishra and joined by Reyaansh Vir Chadha to portray the negative lead Angad. The title song is sung by Palak Muchhal.

See also  
 List of programmes broadcast by Zee TV

References

External links 
 
 Aggar Tum Na Hote on ZEE5

2021 Indian television series debuts
2022 Indian television series endings
Hindi-language television shows
Indian drama television series
Zee TV original programming